"Wombass" is an instrumental composition by Dutch disc jockeys and producers Tiësto and Oliver Heldens. It was released on 9 November 2015 in the Netherlands.

Background and release 
The track was revealed in live by the duo at Amsterdam Music Festival in 2015.

Reviews 
Garrett Smith from YourEDM affirm that "The two dance music superstars create a high-energy, future house tune that will ignite dance floors at festivals around the world. Soaring future house synths sit atop thumping kicks that give the track an undeniable groove." Bulbi from French webmedia Guettapen considers the track as "a pure future house classic, in the legacy of 'Koala' for example."

Music video 
The instrumental's accompanying music video premiered on 11 November 2015 on Spinnin' Records's account on YouTube.

Track list 
Digital Download (MF143)
 "Wombass" - 4:00
 "Wombass" (Extended Mix) - 4:59

2018 Translucent Yellow 7" Vinyl
 "Wombass" (Radio Edit) - 4:00
 "Wombass" (Extended Mix) - 4:59

Charts

"The Right Song" 

"The Right Song" is a song by Dutch DJs and producers Tiësto and Oliver Heldens, featuring guest vocals from Dutch singer Natalie La Rose. The single was released in the United Kingdom on iTunes in 22 January 2016. The single is the vocal version of Tiësto and Oliver Heldens' 2015 single "Wombass".

Music video 
The song's accompanying music video which features a cleaner (portrayed by Emma Farnell-Watson) dancing in an office and with a vacuum cleaner premiered on 22 January 2016 on Tiësto's account on YouTube. Also a dance edition video was shot and released on youtube on April 15th, 2015 and it was directed by Alex Acosta.

Track listing 
Digital download
 "The Right Song" - 3:25

'''Digital download – remixes
 "The Right Song" (Dillon Francis Remix) - 4:04
 "The Right Song" (Basement Jaxx Zone Dub) - 5:41
 "The Right Song" (Mike Williams Remix) - 4:50
 "The Right Song" (Tom Zanetti & KO Kane Remix) - 4:44

Charts

Weekly charts

Year-end charts

Certifications

References

External links

2015 singles
2016 singles
2015 songs
Tiësto songs
Oliver Heldens songs
Natalie La Rose songs
Universal Records singles
Songs written by Emily Warren
Songs written by Tiësto
Songs written by Oliver Heldens